The Boston mayoral election of 1897 occurred on Tuesday, December 21, 1897. In a rematch of the previous election, Democratic candidate and incumbent Mayor of Boston Josiah Quincy defeated Republican candidate and former mayor Edwin Upton Curtis, and two other contenders, to win re-election to a second term.

Inaugural exercises were held on Monday, January 3, 1898.

Candidates
 Edwin Upton Curtis (Republican), former Mayor of Boston (1895), and City Clerk of Boston (1889–1890)
 David Goldstein (Socialist Labor)
 Josiah Quincy (Democrat), Mayor of Boston since 1896, former member of the Massachusetts House of Representatives (1887–1888, 1890–1891), and United States Assistant Secretary of State (1893)
 Thomas Riley (Bryan Democrat), attorney—the Bryan Democrats had split away from Democrats in Boston who had "repudiated the Chicago platform" (a reference to the 1896 Democratic National Convention and presidential nominee William Jennings Bryan)

Results

See also
List of mayors of Boston, Massachusetts

References

Further reading

External links
 Boston Mayor Race - Dec 21, 1897 at ourcampaigns.com

1897
Boston
Boston mayoral
19th century in Boston